Carlos Antonio Toro Coronado (born 4 February 1976) is a Chilean former football goalkeeper.

Club career
He reached his better season with Santiago Wanderers in 2001, being called up to the Chile national team.

International career
He represented Chile at under-20 level in both the 1995 South American Championship and the 1995 FIFA World Youth Championship.

At senior level, he made his debut on 21 March 2001 in a friendly against Honduras. He obtained a total number of three caps for his native country, and was a member of the team competing at the 2001 Copa América. In addition, he made an appearance for Chile B in the friendly match against Catalonia on 28 December 2001.

Honours

Club
Santiago Wanderers
 Primera División de Chile (1): 2001

References

External links

Carlos Toro at MemoriaWanderers 

1976 births
Living people
Sportspeople from Viña del Mar
Chilean footballers
Chile international footballers
Chile under-20 international footballers
Everton de Viña del Mar footballers
San Luis de Quillota footballers
Santiago Wanderers footballers
Provincial Osorno footballers
Chilean Primera División players
Tercera División de Chile players
Primera B de Chile players
2001 Copa América players
Association football goalkeepers